In computer engineering, a register–memory architecture is an instruction set architecture that allows operations to be performed on (or from) memory, as well as registers. If the architecture allows all operands to be in memory or in registers, or in combinations, it is called a "register plus memory" architecture.

In a register–memory approach one of the operands for operations such as the ADD operation may be in memory, while the other is in a register. This differs from a load–store architecture (used by RISC designs such as MIPS) in which both operands for an ADD operation must be in registers before the ADD.

An example of register-memory architecture is Intel x86. Examples of register plus memory architecture are:

 IBM System/360 and its successors, which support memory-to-memory fixed-point decimal arithmetic operations, but not binary integer or floating-point arithmetic operations;
 VAX, which supports memory or register source and destination operands for binary integer and floating-point arithmetic;
 the Motorola 68000 series, which supports integer arithmetic with a memory source or destination, but not with a memory source and destination.

See also
 Load–store architecture
Addressing mode

References

Computer architecture